HLM is a form of housing in France and Switzerland.

HLM may also refer to:
 HLM (Dakar), a commune d'arrondissement of the city of Dakar, Senegal
 ASC HLM, a Senegalese football club
 High Life Music, a record label
 Him Loktantrik Morcha, a political front in Himachal Pradesh, India
 Hierarchical linear model, in statistics
 Holmwood railway station, in England
 Park Township Airport, in Holland, Michigan, United States
 Hotline Miami, a video game by Dennaton Games